Hyalochna is a genus of moths in the family Cosmopterigidae.

Species
Hyalochna allevata Meyrick, 1918
Hyalochna malgassella Viette, 1963

References

Natural History Museum Lepidoptera genus database

Cosmopterigidae